Anthony Royce Mills (12 May 1942 – 21 May 2019) was an English television, stage and film actor.

He attended Eastbourne College, then studied fine art for five years and qualified as a theatre designer before attending the Guildhall School where he was a prize-winning student. He then joined in Bristol Old Vic and appeared in many theatres. In later years he proved himself to be among the finest pantomime dames in the country, notably in his appearances at the Yvonne Arnaud Theatre, Guildford. Mills was a performer with the Theatre of Comedy (from 1983), whose artistic director was Ray Cooney, and at the National Theatre. From around 1999, he appeared in Gilbert and Sullivan productions for the revived D'Oyly Carte company at the Savoy Theatre.

He became a legend of the West End having acted in most of the theatres during a career that lasted more than fifty years, starring alongside Peter O'Toole in Jeffrey Bernard is Unwell  later revived by Tom Conti with whom Mills teamed up with many times in other productions.

Mills was in the original production of Phantom of the Opera with Michael Crawford, playing Monsieur Firmin - the Theatre Manager. Other musicals include Some Like it Hot with Tommy Steele.

Mills made numerous television and film appearances including History of the World, Part I (1981) with Mel Brooks  and the Frankie Howerd films Up Pompeii and Up the Chastity Belt (1971), and has appeared with many entertainers including; Marti Caine, Bing Crosby, Jim Davidson, Les Dawson, Dick Emery and Mike Yarwood. He also provided voiceovers for many television commercials.

Mills died shortly after his 77th birthday on 21 May 2019.

Filmography

References

External links

1942 births
2019 deaths
People from Tetbury
Male actors from Gloucestershire
English male television actors
English male film actors
20th-century English male actors
21st-century English male actors